WASP-26 is a yellow main sequence star in the constellation of Cetus.

Star characteristics 
WASP-26 is an old star close to leaving the main sequence and is part of a wide binary. The binary's projected separation is 3800 astronomical units, its companion star being a red dwarf with an effective temperature of 4600K and a visual magnitude of 13.6. WASP-26 produces a large amount of ultraviolet light due to frequent flares, with an average ultraviolet flux close to the F7 class main-sequence star WASP-1.

Planetary system 
The "Hot Jupiter" class planet WASP-26b was discovered around WASP-26 in 2010. The planet would have an equilibrium temperature of 1660 K, but measured temperatures are slightly higher at 1775K and no noticeable difference exists between the day-side and the night-side of the planet. A 2011 study using the Rossiter-McLaughlin effect failed to determine the inclination of the planetary orbit to the equatorial plane of the parent star due to high stellar noise, but an initial constraint of -34° was published in 2012.

References 

Planetary systems with one confirmed planet
Cetus (constellation)
G-type subgiants
Planetary transit variables
26
J00182469-1516022